Mattan may refer to:
 Mattan, Jammu and Kashmir, a town in India
 Matan (given name), also spelt Mattan, a Hebrew given name
 Mattan I, a 9th-century BC Phoenician king
 Mattan, a minor Biblical figure
 Mahmood Hussein Mattan (died 1952), Somali seaman
 Mohammed Abdullah Taha Mattan, Palestinian detainee at Guantanamo Bay
 Nico Mattan (born 1971), Belgian cyclist
 Pritam Singh Mattan, Mauritian executive

See also 
 Matan (disambiguation)
 Matton (disambiguation)